Russell Merriman (born 6 April 1968) is a former Australian rules footballer who played for Geelong in the Australian Football League (AFL) during the early 1990s.

Merriman, a rover, came to Geelong from St Kilda's reserves side but played his earliest football at Redan. He kicked 19 goals in his debut season and participated in the 1992 AFL Grand Final, after helping Geelong win the Preliminary Final against Footscray with four goals. he now has 3 kids.

References

Holmesby, Russell and Main, Jim (2007). The Encyclopedia of AFL Footballers. 7th ed. Melbourne: Bas Publishing.

1968 births
Living people
Australian rules footballers from Victoria (Australia)
Geelong Football Club players
Redan Football Club players
St Joseph's Football Club players